New York, New York is an upcoming musical with a book by David Thompson and Sharon Washington with music and lyrics by John Kander and Fred Ebb and additional lyrics by Lin-Manuel Miranda based loosely on the 1977 film of the same name directed by Martin Scorsese starring Liza Minnelli and Robert De Niro. The musical features the classic songs 'New York, New York' and 'The World Goes Round'.

Production

Broadway (2023) 
The  musical will have its world premiere at the St. James Theatre on Broadway and is scheduled to begin previews on March 24 and open on April 26, 2023. The production will be directed and choreographed by Susan Stroman and will star Colton Ryan as Jimmy Doyle and Anna Uzele as Francine Evans.

On February 1, the remaining cast, including Clyde Alves, Emily Skinner, Janet Dacal, and more, was announced.

References

External links

2023 musicals
Broadway musicals
Musicals based on films
Musicals by Kander and Ebb
Plays set in New York City

Musicals by Lin-Manuel Miranda